Southern California University of Health Sciences (SCUHS) is a private university located in Whittier, California and specializing in the health sciences. Academics are organized into four colleges and schools: the Los Angeles College of Chiropractic, the College of Eastern Medicine, the College of Science & Integrative Health, and the School of Professional Studies. SCUHS programs include acupuncture and traditional Chinese medicine (TCM), which are regarded by the mainstream medicine and science communities as pseudoscience. The university is accredited by the WASC Senior College and University Commission.

History 
Originally a chiropractic school, SCUHS began as Los Angeles College of Chiropractic (LACC) at its founding on October 18, 1911 by Dr. Charles Cale and his wife Linnie Cale. The first graduating class had only three students, and classes were taught in the Cales' private residence. By 1912, the school had moved to an opera house in Los Angeles and had grown to 113 students.

In 1922, the Chiropractic Initiative Act of 1922 passed, allowing the state to create a board of chiropractic examiners. This act served as a catalyst for the creation of many other chiropractic institutions in California, most of which LACC would acquire within the next three decades.

In the 1940s, the California Chiropractic Educational Foundation acquired several remaining colleges in California, including LACC. They reorganized the colleges, keeping the name Los Angeles College of Chiropractic, and moved the school's location to Glendale, California in 1950. In 1971 this campus received a $3 million renovation following damage sustained in the 1971 San Fernando earthquake.

In 1981, the college moved to its current location in Whittier, California after purchasing a new 38-acre campus on the former site of Lowell High School.

LACC was first accredited in 1993 by the Western Association of Schools and Colleges. It was the only chiropractic college accredited by the WASC at the time.

From 1999 to 2000, LACC added a College of Acupuncture and Oriental Medicine and reorganized itself into the Southern California University of Health Sciences to house both programs.

As of 2020, the university continued to grow, adding two new masters programs; Master of Science in Medical Science and a Master of Acupuncture and Chinese Medicine. In addition, the university was restructured to include LACC, Accelerated Sciences Division, Physician Assistant Program, and Health Science Program.

Academics
The university's chiropractic program is based on the trimester system and is 10 trimesters long. LACC also offers three post-graduate residency programs in chiropractic: Diagnostic Imaging, Sports Medicine, and Primary Spine Care. The Doctor of Chiropractic degree program is accredited by the Commission on Accreditation of the Council on Chiropractic Education (CCE) and the California Board of Chiropractic Examiners.

SCUHS's School of Professional Studies (SPS) and Institute of Science (IOS) offer a comprehensive undergraduate science curriculum that leads to a B.S. in Biological Sciences.

The College of Acupuncture and Oriental Medicine is a nine-trimester program fully accredited by the Accreditation Commission for Acupuncture and Oriental Medicine (ACAOM), the recognized accrediting agency for the approval acupuncture and oriental medicine programs. It is also approved by the California Acupuncture Board.

In addition to LACC and the College of Eastern Medicine, SCUHS is home to two Ayurvedic certificate programs: a wellness educator program and an Ayurvedic practitioner program. The Ayurvedic practitioner program is supported by the California Association of Ayurvedic Medicine and the National Ayurvedic Medical Association. Currently there are no official licenses in the United States to practice Ayurveda.

The school also offers certification and continuing education in massage therapy.

As of 2018, the ARC-PA has granted Accreditation – Provisional status to the Master in Science: Physician Assistant program at SCUHS.

Location
SCU is located in the suburb of Whittier, 20 miles southeast of Los Angeles. Whittier borders Orange County.

References

External links
Official website

Chiropractic schools in the United States
Universities and colleges in Los Angeles County, California
Whittier, California
Schools accredited by the Western Association of Schools and Colleges
Educational institutions established in 1911
1911 establishments in California
Private universities and colleges in California